Pro A may refer to several sports leagues:

Basketball 
 LNB Pro A, the first division of professional men's basketball in France
 ProA, the second division of professional men's basketball in Germany and the top level of the 2. Basketball Bundesliga
 Pro A (Tunisia), the first division of professional men's basketball in Tunisia

Volleyball 

 Pro A (volleyball), the first division of professional men's volleyball in France